Keith Briggs may refer to:

Keith Briggs (mathematician), English mathematician 
Keith Briggs (footballer) (born 1981), English football player